Michael Burke is an Irish economist. He is a former senior international economist at Citibank in London and currently works as an economic consultant.

Burke advocates a united Ireland and has appeared in debates on the topic, he stresses what he believes is the economic case for this. He has written multiple articles for The Guardian and writes blog posts regularly on the blog, Socialist Economic Bulletin. On the 9 December 2016 he presented his paper  "The Economic Case for Irish Unity" to the European Parliament. He also spoke at an event launching a study called "Modelling Irish Unity". He claims that the Northern Ireland economy is in stagnation and that only a united Ireland can allow the economy to grow again.

References

Living people
Year of birth missing (living people)
21st-century Irish economists
Irish nationalists